Myrteta angelica is a moth in the family Geometridae first described by Arthur Gardiner Butler in 1881. It is found in Japan, China and Taiwan.

The wingspan is 34–40 mm.

The larvae feed on Styrax species.

References

Moths described in 1881
Caberini
Moths of Japan